Supermathematics is the branch of mathematical physics which applies the mathematics of Lie superalgebras to the behaviour of bosons and fermions. The driving force in its formation in the 1960s and 1970s was Felix Berezin.

Objects of study include superalgebras (such as super Minkowski space and super-Poincaré algebra), superschemes, supermetrics/supersymmetry, supermanifolds, supergeometry, and supergravity, namely in the context of superstring theory.

References
 "The importance of Lie algebras"; Professor Isaiah Kantor, Lund University

External links
 Felix Berezin, The Life and Death of the Mastermind of Supermathematics, edited by Mikhail Shifman, World Scientific, Singapore, 2007, 

Mathematical physics
Supersymmetry
Lie algebras
String theory